The 2017 Israeli Final Four was the concluding tournament of the 2016–17 Israeli Basketball Super League. It was the eight Israeli Final Four. The Event was held in the Menora Mivtachim Arena in Tel Aviv, Israel between 12 and 15 June.

Results

Bracket

Semi-finals

Final

Winning roster

References

Specific

General
IBA's official website (Hebrew)

2017 Final Four